Bahnschutzpolizei (BSP) (Railway Protection Police) in Nazi Germany was made up of full-time and part-time police officers who were employees of the Reichsbahn (state railways). The Bahnschutzpolizei was tasked with railway safety and also with preventing espionage and sabotage of railway property. It was not subordinated to Hauptamt Ordnungspolizei, only the Deutsche Reichsbahn.

Origins
The BSP was founded in 1939 after a merger of the Bahnpolizei (Railway Police) and the Reichsbahnschutz (Railway Protection Force). The former railway police formed the permanent cadre, while the bulk of the organization consisted of the former railway protection men, railway employees who alongside their day-time job served as a security force.

Organization
The BSP was a special police organization (Sonderpolizei) completely subordinated to the Deutsche Reichsbahn. It was not dependent on Ordnungspolizei. During World War II most of the BSP personnel were mobilized and used as a permanent railway security force in the occupied Eastern Europe. As a replacement within Germany, the SS-Bahnschutz, a railway security force under the SS was founded in 1944.

Ranks

References

External links
 German Railway-Police: Cloth Headgear, Uniforms, Insignia, Cuff Titles and Photos Text in German language.
 Uniformen des Streifdienstes, Bahnschutz und der Bahnschutzpolizei in der Zeit von 1926 bis 1945

Police units of Nazi Germany